This is a list of yearly Lone Star Conference football standings.

Lone Star standings

References

Standings
Lone Star Conference
College football-related lists